Thomas John Lloyd (1882 – 27 April 1938) was a Welsh international, rugby union forward who played club rugby for Neath. He won seven international caps for Wales from 1909 to 1914; his last as part of the 'Terrible Eight', the Wales pack that played Ireland in a violent match before the First World War ended international competition.

International matches played

Wales
  1914
  1909, 1913, 1914
  1913, 1914
  1909, 1910

Bibliography

References

1882 births
1938 deaths
Glynneath RFC players
Neath RFC players
Rugby union players from Neath
Rugby union forwards
Wales international rugby union players
Welsh rugby union players